The R. W. Wood Prize is an award endowed by Xerox and given by The Optical Society to an individual that makes an outstanding technical contribution or an invention in the field of optics. The award was established in 1975 in commemoration of Robert W. Wood.

Past winners of the award include Margaret Murnane, Marvin Minsky, Carl Wieman, Gérard Mourou, and Theodore H. Maiman.

Recipients

 2022 - Shanhui Fan
 2021 - Tobias Kippenberg
 2020 - John Michael Dudley
 2019 - Jian-Wei Pan
 2018 - 
 2017 - Michal Lipson
 2016 - 
 2015 - Peter J. Nordlander
 2015 - Naomi Halas
 2014 - 
 2013 - Milton Feng
 2012 - Eric Van Stryland
 2012 - 
 2011 - 
 2010 - 
 2010 - Margaret Murnane
 2009 - Paul G. Kwiat
 2008 - Andrew M. Weiner
 2008 - 
 2007 - Bahram Jalali
 2006 - Alexander Efros
 2006 - Aleksey Ekimov
 2006 - Louis E. Brus
 2005 - 
 2004 - Rangaswamy Srinivasan
 2004 - James J. Wynne
 2004 - Samuel E. Blum
 2003 - 
 2002 - 
 2001 - Federico Capasso
 2000 - Marvin Minsky
 2000 - 
 2000 - 
 1999 - Eric A. Cornell
 1999 - Carl Wieman
 1998 - Robert L. Byer
 1998 - 
 1997 - 
 1996 - Eli Yablonovitch
 1995 - Gérard Mourou
 1994 - 
 1993 - 
 1993 - LeGrand Van Uitert
 1992 - Yuri N. Denisyuk
 1991 - 
 1991 - Richard M. Osgood
 1991 - 
 1990 - 
 1989 - 
 1988 - 
 1988 - David A. B. Miller
 1987 - David E. Aspnes
 1986 - 
 1986 - 
 1985 - David H. Auston
 1984 - Otto Wichterle
 1983 - 
 1982 - Linn F. Mollenauer
 1981 - Charles V. Shank
 1981 - Erich P. Ippen
 1980 - Anthony E. Siegman
 1979 - Peter Franken
 1978 - Peter P. Sorokin
 1977 - Peter Fellgett
 1976 - Theodore H. Maiman
 1975 - Emmett N. Leith
 1975 - Juris Upatnieks

See also

 List of physics awards

References

Awards of Optica (society)